, was the 7th  Naitō daimyō of Murakami Domain under the Edo period Tokugawa shogunate of Japan. He was also known as Naitō Nobumoto (内藤信思).  His courtesy title was Kii-no-kami. 

Nobuchika was the third son of Naitō Nobuatsu, the previous daimyō. He became heir in 1822 on the death of his elder brother, and became daimyō in 1825 on the death of his father. In the year 1843 he was appointed Jisha-bugyō and in 1849 became Osaka jōdai. In 1850, he was appointed Kyoto Shoshidai and rose to the post of rōjū 1851, holding that post until 1862 During his tenure as rōjū he was influential in the Bunsei reforms and the Kōbu gattai movement to strengthen the shogunate through union with the Imperial family of Japan. His wife was a daughter of Matsudaira Sadanobu of Shirakawa Domain, author of the Kansei Reforms. He retired in 1864, turning the domain over to his adopted son, Naitō Nobutami, but continued to influence politics to the extent that the domain became a member of the Ōuetsu Reppan Dōmei during the Boshin War and fought in the Battle of Hokuetsu against the Meiji government.  He was arrested by the new government in 1868, but was pardoned in 1869 and died in Tokyo at the age of 63 in 1874.

Notes

References
 Beasley, William G. (1955).  Select Documents on Japanese Foreign Policy, 1853–1868. London: Oxford University Press. [reprinted by RoutledgeCurzon, London, 2001.   (cloth)]

|-

|-

1813 births
1874 deaths
Fudai daimyo
People of the Boshin War
Kyoto Shoshidai
Osaka jōdai
Rōjū
Naitō clan